Wei is a Chinese given name. The form 伟 (wěi in pinyin) is the most common Chinese given name, accounting for approximately 0.5% of Chinese people.

Possible writings
Wei can be written using different Chinese characters and can mean:

As a masculine name:

威, "power"
巍, "lofty"
伟, "great"
卫，"guard"

As a feminine name:

 薇, "rose"
 微, "small"

Unisex:

唯, "only"
未，"future"
巍, "lofty"

List of people with the given name Wei
 Wei Wei (韦唯), Chinese singer
 Tang Wei (湯唯), Chinese actress
 Dou Wei (竇唯), Chinese singer and songwriter
 Son Wei (孫暐), Japanese fashion model (of Chinese origin)
 Wei Chen (journalist), Canadian television and radio journalist 
 Wei Chen (singer), Chinese singer
 Shen Wei (沈瑋), Chinese artist and photographer
 Zhao Wei, Chinese film actress and pop singer, sometimes referred to by her English name, Vicki Zhao
Wei (stage name), Korean rapper from the k-pop group "up10tion"

Fictional characters
 Wei, a character from The Lingo Show, a kids' TV show.
 Wei Shen, a Hong Kong-American police detective in Sleeping Dogs, a 2012 Action-Adventure game made by Square Enix and United Front Games.
 Wei Wuxian (魏无羡), main character from the Chinese BL web novel Mo Dao Zu Shi  and show based on same novel The Untamed (web series)
 Shen Wei (沈巍), a character from the Chinese BL web novel and show Guardian (web series) written by Priest.

See also
 Wei (surname)

References

Chinese given names